AXN Crime was a European movie channel owned by Sony Pictures Entertainment, which is broadcast eighteen hours per day, between 11:00 am and 03:00 am. It was available in Poland, Hungary, Romania and Bulgaria on Boom TV, Bulsatcom, Cyfra Plus, Cyfrowy Polsat, Digi TV, Dolce, iNES, Max TV and N. The channel was launched in the Czech Republic and Slovakia in October 2007.

On July 12, 2013, Sony announced that AXN Sci Fi and AXN Crime would be replaced by AXN Black and AXN White. On October 1, AXN Crime is replaced by AXN White.

See also
 AXN
 AXN Crime Poland
 AXN Sci Fi

References

External links
 AXN Crime site, with links to the local versions

AXN
Sony Pictures Television
Sony Pictures Entertainment
Television channels and stations established in 2006
Television channels and stations disestablished in 2013
Television networks in Bulgaria
Television in Hungary
Defunct television channels in Poland
Defunct television channels in Romania
Movie channels